Loisettea is a genus of sea cucumbers in the family Cucumariidae. It was first described in 1985. The genus name honours Loisette M. Marsh.

Species of this genus are found off the north-western coasts of Australia, and off the Sunda Islands.

Species
The following two species are recognised in the genus Loisettea:
Loisettea amphictena 
Loisettea gazellae

References

Cucumariidae
Holothuroidea genera